The Shiawassee District Library is a public library system that serves,  the residents of the Cities of Owosso and Durand, Michigan and Bennington, Owosso, and Rush Townships. The library system was created in 1994 after the Owosso Public Library and the Durand Memorial Library combined resources.

The Owosso branch is located at 502 West Main Street. The library was built in 1913 from Carnegie grant funds, and the building was dedicated on July 4, 1914. In 1926, the Owosso-born Impressionist painter Frederick Carl Frieseke gave the city of Owosso his painting, Lady With the Sunshade, which originally hung in the library but is now on display at the Shiawassee Arts Council building. Today, the library offers children and adult collections, computer training, and community programs.

References

External links
 

Library buildings completed in 1913
Public libraries in Michigan
Education in Shiawassee County, Michigan
Buildings and structures in Shiawassee County, Michigan
1913 establishments in Michigan